Super Slam Dunk is a Super Nintendo Entertainment System basketball video game that was released in 1993.

Gameplay

The game features 28 fictional teams; 27 of them are based on real cities while the 28th is an all-star team.  There is an exhibition and a playoffs mode. Exhibition is the usual team vs team game, while the playoff mode has eight teams competing to win the championship. When a player takes the ball from one side of the court to the other, the view of the court rotates to reveal the opposite side. Earvin "Magic" Johnson gives the pre-game commentary about the strengths of the teams, while broadcaster Chick Hearn gives the play-by-play during the game.

A view of the basketball court from half court is available featuring isometric graphics. Players can choose to turn fouls on or off and how many minutes that each quarter will be; this can be changed between two minutes and a full-fledged 12 minutes.

Reception
Allgame gave Super Slam Dunk a rating of 2.5 stars out of a possible 5 in their overview.

References

1993 video games
Basketball video games
Magic Johnson
Sports video games set in the United States
Super Nintendo Entertainment System games
Super Nintendo Entertainment System-only games
Video games developed in the United States
Video games with isometric graphics
Virgin Interactive games
Multiplayer and single-player video games